Foundation for Early Learning is a non-profit organization that is dedicated to supporting early childhood development from birth through age five. Founded by Mona Lee Locke, the Foundation grew out of former Washington Governor Gary Locke's Commission on Early Learning and was started with a $10 million gift from Bill and Melinda Gates Foundation. Since its establishment, the Foundation has invested over $7 million in early learning programs and networks in Washington state.

References

Community Grants: Foundation for Early Learning

Early childhood education in the United States
Early childhood educational organizations